Ricky Van Shelton is an American country music artist. His discography consists of nine studio albums, two Christmas albums, four compilation albums, and twenty-eight singles. Of his singles, twenty-six have charted on Billboard country singles charts in the U.S., including ten Number Ones.

Studio albums

Compilation albums

Holiday albums

Singles

As a featured artist

Music videos

Notes 
A^ Don't Overlook Salvation peaked at number 29 on the U.S. Billboard Top Christian Albums chart.

References

Shelton, Ricky Van
Discographies of American artists